KCNL (105.9 FM, "Q105.9 FM") is a radio station licensed to serve the community of Quartzsite, Arizona. The station is owned by Marvin Vosper and airs a classic rock format. It's an affiliate of the syndicated Pink Floyd program "Floydian Slip."

The station was assigned the KCNL call letters by the Federal Communications Commission on August 30, 2013.

References

External links
FCC Public Inspection File for KCNL

CNL (FM)
Radio stations established in 2016
2016 establishments in Arizona
Classic rock radio stations in the United States
La Paz County, Arizona